Škola Animiranog Filma (ŠAF) is a school of animation located in Čakovec, Croatia.

The program's intent is not career development, but to promote cognition, imagination, perseverance, cooperation and pride in one's work for children between the ages of 8 and 12 years old. Edo Lukman has been the head of the school since its founding on February 28, 1975. Since then, over a hundred animated short films have been created by more than 500 children enrolled in the program. ŠAF is an active participant and organizer of many animated film festivals and workshops.

External links
 Official website for Škola Animiranog Filma

Art schools in Croatia
Film schools in Croatia
Animation schools in Croatia
1975 establishments in Croatia
Čakovec